Point Clare railway station is located on the Main Northern line in New South Wales, Australia. It serves the southern Central Coast suburb of Point Clare opening on 28 June 1891.

Platforms & services
Point Clare has two side platforms that are about 5 cars long. It is serviced by NSW TrainLink Central Coast & Newcastle Line services travelling from Sydney Central to Newcastle.

Transport links
Busways operate two routes via Point Claire station:
55: Gosford station to Ettalong Beach
70: Gosford Hospital to Ettalong Beach

References

External links

Point Clare station details Transport for New South Wales

Transport on the Central Coast (New South Wales)
Railway stations in Australia opened in 1891
Regional railway stations in New South Wales
Short-platform railway stations in New South Wales, 4 cars
Main North railway line, New South Wales